Pavel Dmitrovich Padakin (born 8 June 1994) is a Ukrainian-Russian professional ice hockey forward who is currently an unrestricted free agent. He most recently played for HC Sochi of the Kontinental Hockey League (KHL).

Playing career
He played junior hockey for the Calgary Hitmen and Regina Pats of the Western Hockey League, and made his professional debut in the American Hockey League with the Lehigh Valley Phantoms before joining HC Sochi of the KHL in 2016.

After a two-year tenure with HC Neftekhimik Nizhnekamsk, Padakin returned to former club, HC Sochi, agreeing to a one-year deal on 8 May 2020.

References

External links
 

1994 births
Living people
Calgary Hitmen players
Expatriate ice hockey players in Canada
Expatriate ice hockey players in the United States
Fairbanks Ice Dogs players
Lehigh Valley Phantoms players
Naturalised citizens of Russia
HC Neftekhimik Nizhnekamsk players
Reading Royals players
Regina Pats players
Russian ice hockey right wingers
Russian expatriate sportspeople in Canada
Russian expatriate sportspeople in the United States
HC Sochi players
Ukrainian ice hockey right wingers
Ukrainian expatriate sportspeople in Canada
Ukrainian expatriate sportspeople in the United States
Russian expatriate sportspeople in Poland
Ukrainian expatriate sportspeople in Poland
Russian expatriate ice hockey people
Ukrainian expatriate ice hockey people
Expatriate ice hockey players in Poland
Russian expatriate sportspeople in Austria
Ukrainian expatriate sportspeople in Austria
Expatriate ice hockey players in Austria